The Prime Cabinet Secretary of the Republic of Kenya is a post in the executive arm of the Government of Kenya created on 27 September 2022.

History 
On 27 September 2022, President William Ruto issued and signed a Presidential executive order  establishing the office of the Prime Cabinet Secretary of the Republic of Kenya, and nominated Musalia Mudavadi to the position. During President Ruto's live address to the nation, he stated that the Office of the Prime Cabinet Secretary (PCS) is the most senior office in the executive arm of the government after that of the President and Deputy President. Mudavadi was officially sworn in as PCS at State House, Kenya on 27 October 2022.

Functions 
 Assist the President and the Deputy President in the coordination and supervision of Government Ministries and State Departments.
 In liaison with the Ministry responsible for Interior and National Administration, oversee the implementation of National Government policies, programs and projects.
 Chair and Coordinate National Government legislative agenda across all ministries and state departments in consultation with and for transmission to the Party/Coalition Leaders in Parliament
 Facilitate inter-ministerial coordination of cross-functional initiatives and programmers.
 Coordinate and supervise the technical monitoring and evaluation of Government policies, programs and projects across Ministries.
 Perform any other function as may be assigned by the President.

Prime Cabinet Secretaries of Kenya

See also 
 Prime Minister of Kenya

References 

Government of Kenya
2022 establishments in Kenya